Emerson Muschamp Bainbridge (5 December 1845 – 12 May 1911) was an English mining consulting engineer,  philanthropist and Liberal Party politician who sat in the House of Commons from 1895 to 1900.

Life
Bainbridge was born in the village of Eastgate and educated at Doncaster and at Durham University. He was  articled to mining engineering with the Marquis of Londonderry in Durham College.  In 1870 he became  manager of the Sheffield and Tinsley Collieries, and soon afterwards he was in charge of the Nunnery pits on behalf of  the Duke of Norfolk. These  were turned into a limited company in 1874, and he then became managing director with a controlling interest. In 1873 was awarded the Hermon prize for an essay on the prevention of mine explosions. He was head of a noted firm of mining consulting engineers. In 1889 Bainbridge, obtained  a lease from the Duke of Portland for the Tophard or Barnsley coal, under areas of land in Derbyshire and Nottinghamshire. He then founded the Bolsover Colliery Company to take over the lease, and to mine the coal. He was entirely responsible for the development of Bolsover with regard to both the colliery and the New Bolsover model village.  Bainbridge was also interested in local railways, and held many directorships including the Lancashire, Derbyshire and East Coast Railway, the Sheffield District Railway, Hardy Patent Pick Co., New Hucknall Colliery, Yorkshire Engine Co.  and Wharncliffe Silkstone Colliery. He was a great supporter of the project for an East to West railway from Sutton-on-Sea to Liverpool, of which only the eastern portion was completed He also supported the Sheffield Canal, and in 1889 lectured in the town on the possibility of bringing large vessels up the canal into Sheffield.

Bainbridge was known as a philanthropist. He provided money for the Y.M.C.A. scheme at Sheffield,  leading to the establishment of the Association Buildings Co. Ltd. and the headquarters buildings. In 1881 he entertained all the members at Chatsworth.  He built and founded the Jeffie Bainbridge Home for Waifs and Strays at the corner of Norfolk Street and Surrey Street in Sheffield in memory of his wife, the building being opened by the Duke and Duchess of Portland.

At the 1895 general election Bainbridge was elected as Member of Parliament for Gainsborough, but lost the seat in 1900.

Bainbridge was a fine shot and a notable sportsman. In 1905 he built a villa, Roquebrune, between Menton and Monte Carlo, as a potential home for his later days. However he made little use of it before his death  at the age of 65.

A daughter, Eva Jeffie Bainbridge, married Brigadier General William Darell. Another, Patricia Merryweather Bainbridge, married Willoughby Norrie, 1st Baron Norrie on 28 November 1938.

References

External links 

1845 births
1911 deaths
Liberal Party (UK) MPs for English constituencies
UK MPs 1895–1900
English philanthropists
Alumni of Durham University